Per Hess (born 20 January 1946 in Kongsberg) is a Norwegian visual artist. Hess was educated at the School of Arts and Crafts (1970–73) and the Academy of Fine Art (1973–79) in Oslo. Both institutions are now part of the Oslo National Academy of the Arts (KHiO).

After completing his education, Hess worked with expressionist/abstract painting, with an increasing attention to colour. The themes invoked in his later work have included explorations of definitions of value, capital and money, drawing on philosophy and political theory, while retaining an emphasis on painting as a self-referential medium. Hess has received widespread critical acclaim for his work. For example, with reference to his exhibition ‘Down to Business’ at Galleri LNM in 2004, art critic for the Norwegian newspaper Verdens Gang, Lars Elton, wrote that ‘the cathedral triumphs over the stock
exchange because he [Hess] shows that the minimalist and extreme-modernist project has a vitality that far exceeds the capitalists’ power of imagination.’ 

Hess has held a number of solo exhibitions, among them ‘Øyeporten’ at Galleri Gimle in Oslo (1991); ‘Fargebilder’ at Galleri LNM in Oslo (1993); ‘Specially Coloured’ at Kongsberg Kunstforening (1999); ‘White Border’ at Kunstnersenteret i Buskerud in Drammen (2001); ‘Down to Business’ at Galleri LNM (2004); ‘White Wash’ at Hå gamle prestegard, Jæren, (2005); ‘Monet – Money’ at Galleri 1 in Sandvika (2010). Recent, important exhibitions include ‘White Is the New Black’ at Galleri GAD, Oslo (2012) and ‘Personal Structures’ at Palazzo Bembo, 55 Biennale di Venezia (2013).

Hess has had a number of public commissions, including a floor-based installation across four stories at the Department of Informatics at the University of Oslo (1988); ‘Seeds’, which is a comprehensive commission stretching across the floors, walls and ceiling of Oslo University Hospital, Rikshospitalet (The National Hospital) (1996-2000); ‘Via’, which is a series of 16 wall-paintings at the Oslo University Hospital, Rikshospitalet (1998–2000); and the ‘Bridges’ series for the Drammen Police building (2001).

Hess has also worked as an artistic consultant on a number of public art projects, including those taking place at the University of Oslo Faculty of Law; the Faculty of Sciences at the University of Oslo; the BI Norwegian School of Management; the University of Bergen; Helga Engs Hus at the University of Oslo; the University of Oslo Library; the hospital ‘Sykehuset Asker og Bærum’ in Sandvika: Aker Solutions’ headquarters at Snarøya; the Norwegian Theatre in Oslo; Kilden Performing Arts Centre in Kristiansand.

Hess has sat on the board of the national organization for visual artists in Norway, Norske Billedkunstnere (NBK) (The Norwegian Visual Artists) as well as this organisation’s predecessors Bildende Kunstneres Styre (BKS), and Norske Billedkunstneres Fagorganisasjon (NBFO); the organisation for visual artists in Oslo and Akershus (BOA); and Trafo Artists’ House in Oslo. Hess has also been the editor of Norwegian art journal ‘Billedkunst’.

Hess is a member of the national organization for visual artists in Norway Norske Billedkunstnere (NBK) and the Norwegian Association of Painters (LNM) He lives and works in Oslo.

References

Norwegian artists
Norwegian male artists
Living people
1946 births
People from Kongsberg